Renato Cila is a retired Brazilian professional soccer defender who played in both the North American Soccer League and Major Indoor Soccer League.

Cila signed with Corinthians when he was 17.  He also played for Atletico Madrid, and Espinho before moving to Toronto and Montreal Castors to play in the National Soccer League. In 1978, Cila signed with the New York Arrows of the Major Indoor Soccer League.  At the time, most of the Arrows also played for the Rochester Lancers of the North American Soccer League and Cila joined the Lancers for the 1979 outdoor season.  On July 15, 1980, the New England Tea Men purchased Cila's contract from the Lancers then released him at the end of the season.  In April 1981, Cila was given a league record fine of $5,000 and a thirteen-game suspension for striking an official during an Arrows playoff game.  In 1982, the Baltimore Blast signed Cila, but he was back with the Arrows for the 1983-1984 season.

His son is former Major League Soccer player Jordan Cila.

References

External links
 NASL career stats

1951 births
Living people
Baltimore Blast (1980–1992) players
Brazilian footballers
Brazilian expatriate footballers
Major Indoor Soccer League (1978–1992) players
Montreal Castors players
New England Tea Men players
Rochester Lancers (1967–1980) players
New York Arrows players
Canadian National Soccer League players
North American Soccer League (1968–1984) players
Association football defenders
Brazilian expatriate sportspeople in Canada
Brazilian expatriate sportspeople in the United States
Expatriate soccer players in Canada
Expatriate soccer players in the United States
Footballers from São Paulo